The Bathurst Street Lamps are heritage-listed street lights located in the Bathurst central business district in the Bathurst Region, New South Wales, Australia. They were built from 1872 to 1924. They were added to the New South Wales State Heritage Register on 1 August 2003. There are 105 lights in total that are located on Howick, William, George, Keppel, Russell, and Church Streets, in King's Parade, and in Machattie Park.

History

Aboriginal people and colonisation
Aboriginal occupation of the Blue Mountains area dates back at least 12,000 years and appears to have intensified some 3000–4000 years ago. In pre-colonial times the area now known as Bathurst was inhabited by Aboriginal people of the Wiradjuri linguistic group. The clan associated with Bathurst occupied on a seasonal basis most of the Macquarie River area. They moved regularly in small groups but preferred the open land and used the waterways for a variety of food. There are numerous river flats where debris from recurrent camps accumulated over a long period. European settlement in this region after the first documented white expedition west of the Blue Mountains in 1813 was tentative because of apprehensions about resistance from Aboriginal people. There was some contact, witnessed by sporadic hostility and by the quantity of surviving artefacts manufactured by the Aborigines from European glass. By 1840 there was widespread dislocation of Aboriginal culture, aggravated after 1850 by the goldrush to the region.

Prior to European settlement in Australia, the Wiradjuri Aboriginal group lived in the upper Macquarie Valley. Bathurst was proclaimed a town by Governor Lachlan Macquarie on 7 May 1815, named after Lord Bathurst, Principal Secretary of State for the Colonies. Bathurst is Australia's oldest inland township.

Bathurst
Governor Macquarie chose the site of the future town of Bathurst on 7 May 1815 during his tour over the Blue Mountains, on the road already completed by convict labour supervised by William Cox. Macquarie marked out the boundaries near the depot established by surveyor George Evans and reserved a site for a government house and domain. Reluctant to open the rich Bathurst Plains to a large settlement, Macquarie authorised few grants there initially, one of the first being 1000 acres to William Lawson, one of the three European explorers who crossed the mountains in 1813. The road-maker William Cox was another early grantee but later had to move his establishment to Kelso on the non-government side of the Macquarie River.

A modest release of land in February 1818 occurred when ten men were chosen to take up 50 acre farms and 2 acre town allotments across the river from the government buildings. When corruption by government supervisor Richard Lewis and acting Commandant William Cox caused their dismissal, they were replaced by Lieutenant William Lawson who became Commandant of the settlement in 1818.

Macquarie continued to restrict Bathurst settlement and reserved all land on the south side of the Macquarie River for government buildings and stock, a situation that prevailed until 1826. In December 1819 Bathurst had a population of only 120 people in 30 houses, two thirds being in the township of Kelso on the eastern side of the river and the remainder scattered on rural landholdings nearby. The official report in 1820 numbered Bathurst settlers at 114, including only 14 women and 15 children. The government buildings comprised a brick house for the commandant, brick barracks for the military detachment and houses for the stock keeper, and log houses for the 50 convicts who worked the government farm. Never successful, the government farm was closed by Governor Darling in 1828.

Governor Darling, arriving in Sydney in 1825, promptly commenced a review of colonial administration and subsequently introduced vigorous reforms. On advice from Viscount Goderich, Darling divided colonial expenditure into two parts: one to cover civil administration, funded by New South Wales; the other for the convict system, funded by Britain.

By this time, J. McBrien and Robert Hoddle had surveyed the existing grants in the vicinity. Surveyor James Bym Richards began work on the south side of the river in 1826. But the town was apparently designed by Thomas Mitchell in 1830 and did not open until late 1833 after Richards had completed the layout of the streets with their two-road allotments. The first sales were held in 1831 before the survey was complete.

In 1832 the new Governor, Major General Sir Richard Bourke, visited Bathurst in October. He instructed the Surveyor General Major Thomas L. Mitchell to make arrangements for "opening the town of Bathurst without delay" and he in turn instructed the Assistant Surveyor at Bathurst J. B. Richards to lay out the blocks and streets. This was done in September 1833. It is believed that Major Mitchell named the streets, with George Street being named after King George III.

Lighting Bathurst's Streets

At the end of 1863 Bathurst Council made the first attempts to light the streets and an order was placed with George Fish, a local engineer, to provide six iron lamps. In January 1864 tenders were called for the supply of kerosene street lamps. They were required to be lit between sunset and sunrise 240 days of the year. Gas was first supplied to Bathurst consumers in 1872 by J. N. Wark's company and his potential biggest client was the Bathurst City Council. The existing paraffin lamps were converted to gas, and soon after two lamps were erected at each of the intersections of George, William with Durham, Howick, Russell and Keppel Streets within the central business district. A special levy of three pence in the pound was placed on property owners in the areas to pay for it. This levy needed special legislation to be enacted. The lights required much maintenance and were often subject to vandalism and the cost of extending mains and repairs to roads afterwards was high. By 1877 Bathurst had 55 street lights. The street lamp standards were removed and replaced with the current style of lamp standard following the introduction of electricity to the city in 1924.

A special lamp standard and horse fountain was installed in 1887 in Machattie Park as a memorial to the Lady Mayoress M. L. Machattie who headed a ladies committee that made a significant contribution to the Machattie Park project. She was married to Dr T. A. Machattie, the son of Machattie Park's namesake, Dr Richard Machattie. It was erected by the "Women and Girls of Bathurst".

Bathurst City Council took over ownership of all the historic lamp standards in the Bathurst CBD from Advance Energy (previously Southern Mitchell County Council) in 1998.

Description 
There are 105 lamps in total. They include:
 49 twin light lamp standards that line the centre of Howick, William, George and Keppel Streets.
 2 twin light lamp standards in King's Parade
 53 single light lamp standards located within King's Parade, Machattie Park and line the centre of Russell and Church Streets.
 M.L. Machattie: lamp/horse trough fountain - On the corner of George and Keppel Streets is a large dish-style drinking fountain set on four cast iron hoofed legs. It is surmounted by a five-branched light on top of a tall column . Originally this lamp had a single gas lamp. A plaque halfway up the column reads "1887 Jubilee fountain erected by the Women and Girls of Bathurst, M.L. T. A Machattie, Mayoress".

The Machattie Park lamps are generally older than the others and include a central single globe reminiscent of the original gas light fittings.

The street lamp posts were reported to be generally in fair condition as at 3 October 2002; however, most were in need of re-painting and some were in need of cleaning. Corrosion was also occurring at the base of some. Signage that is connected directly to the lamp posts should be removed.

The M. L. Machattie lamp/horse trough and drinking fountain is in poor condition and the water fountain (bowl) is corroded and in need of treatment for corrosion and painting. Above, the lamps are in good condition.

The Machattie Park and King's Parade lamp posts are generally in fair condition; however, some have a slight lean while others are in need of paint and some in need of cleaning. Corrosion is also at the base of some.

While in need of repair and maintenance, the Bathurst street lamps are highly intact.

Heritage listing 
The Bathurst street and park lamp standards (105 in total) are a major element of nineteenth and early twentieth century street furniture that contributes to the distinctive historical character of the central civic and business areas of Bathurst. They are situated in Bathurst's central parks, Machattie and King's Parade and line the centre of six main streets. Installed between 1872 and 1924 when electricity replaced gas, the lamp posts are unusual in design, incorporating Victorian bases and Art Deco elements. The lamps posts are intact and in generally good condition. Comprising a large group of street lamps, they form a distinctive civic landmark in Bathurst and are rare in New South Wales.

Bathurst Street Lamps were listed on the New South Wales State Heritage Register on 1 August 2003 having satisfied the following criteria.

The place is important in demonstrating the course, or pattern, of cultural or natural history in New South Wales.

The Bathurst street lamps, as a group, are of state significance as a large and rare collection of street and park lamps. They demonstrate the civic development of Bathurst in the late nineteenth and early twentieth centuries and the city's conversion from gas to electricity. They make an important addition to Bathurst's historical identity.

The place has a strong or special association with a person, or group of persons, of importance of cultural or natural history of New South Wales's history.

The Bathurst street lamps has strong local associations with the civic works programs of the Bathurst City Council in providing local services and amenities. They are a strong visual demonstration of the local council's work in developing the Bathurst region.

The M. L. Machattie lamp/horse trough and fountain has local associations with the Lady Mayoress M L Machattie. It was erected to commemorate her contribution to the civic life of Bathurst and demonstrates the esteem in which she was held by the female community of Bathurst.

The place is important in demonstrating aesthetic characteristics and/or a high degree of creative or technical achievement in New South Wales.

The Bathurst street lamps are of state significance as aesthetically significant civic structures. They form a large, highly intact group of early electric street lamps.

Made of cast iron, the lamps are distinctive in combining Victorian bases with Art Deco elements. They are unusual in incorporating twin globes on a single standard base. Their design displays both the functional and decorative aspects of gas and early electric street lighting. They make a highly visible and valued contribution to the central Bathurst streetscape.

The Bathurst street lamps are arguably one of the most well-known landmarks in Bathurst and make an important contribution to the city's strong sense of historical and civic identity.

The place has a strong or special association with a particular community or cultural group in New South Wales for social, cultural or spiritual reasons.

The Bathurst street lamps are aesthetically distinctive and valued by the local community as historic civic structures. This is demonstrated by their inclusion in the Bathurst Heritage Study, the William and George Main Street Study and their listing on the Register of the National Estate as part of the Central Bathurst Conservation Area.

The place has potential to yield information that will contribute to an understanding of the cultural or natural history of New South Wales.

The Bathurst street lamps are of state significance for their research potential. They have potential to reveal further information on early twentieth century gas and electric lighting design and technology.

They are unlikely to display any archaeological potential due to the previous disturbance of the streets and public gardens.

The place possesses uncommon, rare or endangered aspects of the cultural or natural history of New South Wales.

As a group of over 100 lamps, the Bathurst street lamps are of state significance as a large, rare and highly intact collection of civic street lamps, dating from the early twentieth century and demonstrating the conversion from gas to electric lighting.

The place is important in demonstrating the principal characteristics of a class of cultural or natural places/environments in New South Wales.

The Bathurst street lamps are representative of street lighting design and technology from the early twentieth century. However, their high quality, streetscape prominence and large number make them rare in New South Wales.

See also

References

Bibliography

Attribution

External links

New South Wales State Heritage Register
Bathurst, New South Wales
Articles incorporating text from the New South Wales State Heritage Register
1872 establishments in Australia